Deuteronomium - Der Tag des jüngsten Gericht (English: Deuteronomy - The Day of Judgment) is a 2004 Swiss horror film written and directed by Roger Grolimund, and co-written by Franziska Lehmann. A direct-to-video release, it stars Samuel Binkert as Michael Luhser, a down on his luck loser who begins punishing sinners at the behest of an angel played by Denise Meili.

Plot 

Michael Luhser is a luckless misanthrope who lives alone in a squalid house in Olten. One day, Michael returns home from his dead-end office job, and is greeted by an angel, who claims that Michael has been chosen by Heaven to punish sinners in the name of God. While initially reluctant to believe the angel, Michael eventually goes out and murders a purse-snatching drug addict, and then a ruthless corporate raider named Gerhard Schmidt and Gerhard's wife, Daniela. After committing another double homicide, that of a dominatrix and her adulterous client, Michael becomes wracked with guilt, and leaves behind a message that reads, "Stop Me Please!" The angel alleviates Michael's doubts by having sex with him, and then has him gun down a greedy and unethical scientist named Doctor West.

While fleeing the scene of the crime, Michael is assaulted by a drunk, and aided by a woman named Sabine, who notices that Michael's bag is full of weapons, which causes her to realize that Michael is the so-called "Murderer of Olten." The angel has Michael drink her blood, and then orders him to kill Sabine. Michael slits Sabine's throat, and then goes out binge drinking before passing out at home, where he is awakened by the Police Commissioner. The Police Commissioner orders Michael to surrender, threatening to shoot him if he does not, but Michael instead shoots himself after sardonically declaring, "No, don't do it! Don't sin." Michael is sent to Hell, where the angel takes his form, and mockingly reveals to Michael that she is actually a demon, one who acted as a convenient "justification" for Michael's crimes, which the demon claims Michael committed simply because he wanted to, and not because he believed in God.

Cast

Release 

The film was released direct-to-video by Swiss Independent Film on October 26, 2004, and was rereleased on DVD by Spasmo Video in June 2018.

Reception 

Deuteronomium was deemed an "above average" film that was technically competent and impressively gory, pros which offset shortcomings like its mediocre story and script, by Dennis Pelzer of Gory News. The film's "dream-like" atmosphere and Olaf Ittenbach's special effects were commended by Davide Di Giorgio of Sentieriselvaggi. Horror News also praised Olaf Ittenbach's gore effects, which they concluded were the only worthwhile aspect of the film, its potentially interesting plot having been squandered by inept execution; in summation, the website wrote, "I wanted so much for this movie to be good, at least along the lines of a Mario Bava/Lucio Fulci movie, something with some teeth in it that can make it a worthwhile watch for people who want to see good gore. And yeah, I guess, if that's all you're in it for, you can be in for a nice treat. You just have to ignore literally everything else in the movie, and you'll have a good time."

See also
 List of films about angels

References

External links 

 

2004 direct-to-video films
2004 directorial debut films
2004 films
2004 horror films
2004 independent films
2000s exploitation films
2000s police films
2000s serial killer films
2000s slasher films
2000s supernatural horror films
2000s vigilante films
Adultery in films
BDSM in films
Crimes against sex workers in fiction
Demons in film
Direct-to-video horror films
Films about angels
Films set in 2004
Films set in forests
Films set in hell
Films set in offices
Films set in Switzerland
Films shot in Switzerland
Home invasions in film
Laboratories in fiction
Murder–suicide in films
Religious horror films
Splatter films
Supernatural slasher films
Swiss German-language films
Swiss horror films
Swiss independent films